Stephen Leonard White (born 1 July 1945, Dublin, Ireland) is British political scientist and historian, Emeritus Professor at University of Glasgow, an author of many articles and books about politics of Soviet Union and Russia.

Stephen White graduated from Trinity College, Dublin with degrees in history and political science, and then completed a PhD in Soviet studies at University of Glasgow (spending a year at Moscow State University as an exchange student) and a DPhil in politics at Wolfson College, Oxford. White was awarded the Marshall Scholarship.

His positions include James Bryce Professor of Politics, a Senior Research Associate of the School of Central and East European Studies at University of Glasgow, a visiting professor at the Institute of Applied Politics in Moscow, and adjunct professor of European Studies at the Johns Hopkins University Bologna Center.

Since 2002 he is Fellow of the Royal Society of Edinburgh. Since 2010 he is Fellow of the British Academy, Section S5 Political Studies: Political Theory, Government and International Relations.

Until 2011 he was a co-editor of The Journal of Communist Studies and Transition Politics.

Books
The USSR: Portrait of a Superpower, 1978, 
Political Culture and Soviet Politics, 1979, Macmillan, 
Britain and the Bolshevik Revolution: A Study in the Politics of Diplomacy, 1920-1924, Holmes & Meier Publishers, Incorporated, 1980, 
(with Daniel Nelson) Communist Legislatures in Comparative Perspective, SUNY Press, 1982, 
(with John Gardner, George Schöpflin) Communist Political Systems: An Introduction,  1982, 1984
Gorbachev in Power, 1990, 
After Gorbachev, 1993, Cambridge University Press, 
(with Graeme Gill, Darrell Slider) The Politics of Transition: Shaping a Post-Soviet Future, 1993, Cambridge University Press, 
Russia Goes Dry: Alcohol, State and Society, Cambridge University Press, 1996, 
(with Richard Rose, Ian McAllister) How Russia Votes, Chatham House Publishers, 1997, 
 (with Evan Mawdsley) The Soviet Elite from Lenin to Gorbachev: The Central Committee and Its Members 1917-1991, 2000, Oxford University Press, 
Russia's New Politics: The Management of a Postcommunist Society, 2000, Cambridge University Press,  (hardcover)  (paperback)
(with Rick Fawn) Russia After Communism, Psychology Press, 2002, 
Communism and Its Collapse, 2002, Routhledge,  
The Origins of Detente: The Genoa Conference and Soviet-Western Relations, 1921-1922, 2002, Cambridge University Press, 
Understanding Russian Politics, 2011, Cambridge University Press,  ("expands and replaces" Russia's New Politics, 2000)
(with Valentina Feklyunina) Identities and Foreign Policies in Russia, Ukraine and Belarus: The Other Europes, Springer, 2014,

Edited collections
 Developments in Soviet Politics, bookseries
 Developments in Russian Politics, book series (9th edition, 2018)
 Developments in Central and East European Politics, book series
 Media, Culture and Society in Putin's Russia (2008) 
 Politics and the Ruling Group in Putin's Russia (2008)
Handbook of Reconstruction in Eastern Europe and the Soviet Union (1991,

References

1945 births
Living people
British political scientists
British historians
Academics of the University of Glasgow
Alumni of the University of Glasgow
Alumni of Wolfson College, Oxford
Alumni of Trinity College Dublin